Vasco José Taborda Ribas (Curitiba, September 18, 1909 - ibidem, April 3, 1997) was a Brazilian lawyer, writer, professor and linguistic.

He went to Ginásio Paranaense (acurrently  Colégio Estadual do Paraná ) and studied law at the Federal University of Paraná.

He was promoter of  Justiça Militar no Brasil , general secretary of  Tribunal de Contas do Paraná , director of Serviço Social do Paraná, procurer of the Tribunal de Contas do Paraná, librarian at the Instituto Neopitagórico and a member of institutions such as Círculo de Estudos Bandeirantes, PEN Clube do Brasil, etc.

Works
Saturnópolis (1940);
Um Episódio da Ocupação de Curitiba pelas Forças Federalistas em 1894 (1944)
O Sete Orelhas
Sapé
Rocha Pombo (1958)
Euclides da Cunha (1959)
Rodrigo Junior (1960)
Leôncio Correia (1960)
Antologia do Folclore Brasileiro (1962)
O Fisquim (1963)
A Estrela e Eu (1963)
Varredores da Madrugada
Antologia de Trovadores do Paraná
Antologia dos Poetas Paranaenses
Trufas
Muçaraí - Movimentos Poéticos (1970)
Almenara - Meditação (1975)
Trovadores do Brasil;
Dicionário Cultural da Língua Portuguesa
Roteiro - Viagem à Amazonia (1978)

References

MURICY, José Candido de A. Panorama do Conto Paranaense. Curitiba: Fundação Cultural de Curitiba, 1979.
TABORDA, Vasco José e WOCZIKOSKY, Orlando. Antologia de Trovadores do Paraná. Curitiba: Edição de O Formigueiro – Instituto Assistencial de Autores do Paraná.
TABORDA, Vasco José. O Fisquim. Curitiba, 1960.

1909 births
1997 deaths
Brazilian writers
People from Curitiba